The 2013 Tipperary Senior Hurling Championship was the 123rd staging of the Tipperary Senior Hurling Championship since its establishment in 1887. The championship began on 15 June 2013 and ended on 13 October 2013.

Thurles Sarsfields were the defending champions, however, they were defeated in their opening game. Loughmore-Castleiney won the title, following a 1-17 to 1-16 defeat of Nenagh Éire Óg in the final.

Results

Quarter-finals

Semi-finals

Final

External links

 Tipperary Senior Hurling Championship results

References

Tipperary Senior Hurling Championship
Tipperary Senior Hurling Championship